Miss Teen International is the name of independently operated annual beauty pageants currently being held in the United States, India, and Ecuador.

In the United States, applicants must be aged 13 to 18 and never have been married or given birth. The pageant is owned by Mary C. Richardson of International Pageants, Inc.

In India, the competition is for teenage girls across the world aged between 14 and 19. The pageant is owned by Nikhil Anand, Indian businessman, founder and chairman of Glamanand Entertainment Pvt. Ltd.

In Ecuador, the pageant is for girls aged 15–19 years of all nationalities and is owned and operated by businessman Rodrigo Moreira.

History and pageant versions

There have been different pageants called Miss Teen International going back to 1966.

United States

1966 to 1969

The first contest bestowing the title of Miss Teen International took place on Wednesday, April 4, 1966 in Hollywood and was hosted by Adam West, star of TV's Batman, with guest appearances by actresses Mia Farrow and Barbara Parkins, actors Vic Morrow and John Astin, singers Robert Goulet and Sonny & Cher, and 1965 Miss Teen USA Susan Henning.

The 1967 Miss Teen International pageant was held again in Hollywood on Saturday, March 20, and was hosted by actress Sally Field and actor-singer Noel Harrison, with 1966 Miss Teen USA Cindy Lewis making an appearance, along with the current 1966 and first Miss Teen International, Ewa Aulin, 17, who crowned her successor.

At the 1968 pageant in Hollywood on Saturday, April 13, there were 12 girls from different countries participating in the event, with Miss Teen USA Pamela Martin, 18, representing the United States.

The pageant was produced by Al Burton and the final competition aired as a single one-hour special nationally in prime time in the United States for each of four consecutive years on the ABC Television network in the United States and syndicated airing in foreign TV markets.

Titleholders — Hollywood, United States

The pageant ceased operation after the 1969 competition.

2002 to present

A new pageant unrelated to the original 1966 version was initiated in the United States in 2002 that bestows the title of Miss Teen International. It is owned by Mary C. Richardson of Roanoke, Virginia, Executive Director and owner of International Pageants, Inc. Richardson owns the trademark in the United States for "Miss Teen International" for beauty pageant use.

The contestants in the United States version of the pageant mainly represent individual U.S. states and currently a limited number of international countries, which over the years has included Australia, Bahamas, Canada, China, Great Britain, Haiti, Hungary, India, Mexico, New Zealand, Nigeria, Philippines, Russia, South Africa, and St. Marrten.

The winner receives a university scholarship. The current 2021 Miss Teen International in the United States is Katie Hoang of Keller, Texas.

Recent titleholders — United States

Costa Rica

1993 to 2014

A version of the pageant unrelated to the original 1966 Hollywood pageant based in Costa Rica began in 1993 by Enrique Gonzalez, who also operated the Mr Costa Rica and Miss Teen Costa Rica pageants. It was held through 2014 with the winner that year being Ailin Adorno, 17, of Paraguay.

Titleholders — Costa Rica pageant

1Number of delegates.

Thailand

2009 to present 

In 2009, plans for a new version of the pageant began by Mister/Miss Teen International & Mister/Miss Pre Teen International/ Pre-Teen & Teen of the Year. Since the first pageant in 2009, it is held annually in Singapore and is considered the largest teen pageant in the world. Mister/Miss Teen International & Mister/Miss Pre Teen International. owns the trademark in Singapore for "Miss Teen International" for beauty pageant use.The first winner of the Miss Teen International pageant in Thailand in 2009 was Nikita Conwi of Philippines. The current 2020 Miss Teen International winner is Mutita Thanomkulbutr of Thailand.

Titleholders — Thailand pageant

2016 to present 

In 2016, plans for a new version of the pageant began by Prince & Princess International. Since the first pageant in 2016, it is held annually in Thailand and is considered the largest teen pageant in the word. Prince & Princess International. owns the trademark in Indonesia for "Miss Teen International" for beauty pageant use.The first winner of the Miss Teen International pageant in Thailand in 2016 was Mika Saito of Australia. The current 2019 Miss Teen International winner is Pischa Saetang of Thailand.

Titleholders — Chiang Mai, Thailand pageant 

1No pageant was held in 2020 due to the global restrictions on public events and international travel imposed by the Covid-19 pandemic.

India

2016 to present

In 2016, plans for a new version of the pageant began by Glamanand Entertainment Pvt. Ltd., owned by Nikhil Anand. Since the first pageant in 2018, it is held annually in India and is considered the largest teen pageant in the word. Glamanand Entertainment Pvt. Ltd. owns the trademark in India for "Miss Teen International" for beauty pageant use.

Odalys Duarte from Mexico emerged as the first winner of Miss Teen International under the ownership of Glamanand Entertainment and Nikhil Anand.

The current Miss Teen International is Ngô Ngọc Gia Hân of Vietnam who was crowned by the outgoing titleholder,  Aayushi Dholakia of India as her successor on 30 July 2022 in New Delhi, India.

Titleholders — India pageant

1No pageant was held in 2020 due to the global restrictions on public events and international travel imposed by the Covid-19 pandemic.

Ecuador

2019 to present

A version of the Miss Teen International pageant based in Ecuador is held annually. It began planning operation in 2018 by Rodrigo Moreira, who filed a trademark application that year in Ecuador for "Miss Teen International" (in English) and was approved in 2019. The pageant was previously called Miss Teenager International from 2014 to 2018. The first winner of the Miss Teen International pageant in Ecuador in 2019 was Luciana Begazo of Peru.

The current winner is Yulienke Jacobs of South Africa, who was crowned as Miss Teen International 2022, on October 19, 2022 in Guayaquil, Ecuador.

Titleholders — Ecuador pageant

1Judging of the competition took place outside of the normal pageant environment due to the global restrictions on public events and international travel imposed by the Covid-19 pandemic. The winner was crowned in a live-streamed event.

Gallery of Titleholders

Vietnam

2022 to present 

In 2022, plans for a new version of the pageant began by Mister and Miss Teen International. Since the first pageant in 2022, it is held annually in Vietnam and is considered the largest teen pageant in the word. Mister and Miss Teen International. owns the trademark in Vietnam  for "Miss Teen International" for beauty pageant use.The first winner of the Miss Teen International pageant in Vietnam in 2022 was Jihaynne Jirah Shamah Hernandez of Philippines.

Titleholders — Vietnam pageant

Countries/Territories by winning number – All pageants

This list includes title winners in all five pageants from the original Miss Teen International in 1966 to the present day.

1Insufficient information to provide a specific number.

See also
 List of beauty contests

References

Teen International
Beauty pageants for youth
Recurring events established in 1993